Stocksund railway station, Stocksunds station, is a railway station at Roslagsbanan, serving Stocksund in Danderyd Municipality, a bit north of Stockholm.

Stocksund station is now a simple railway stop, where only the trains on the way between Stockholm East Station and Näsbypark stops. It is situated 4.6 km from Stockholm East Station.

History
The original Stocksund station was situated some hundred metres to the south east of the present one and was opened shortly after the inauguration of Roslagsbanan. The station building there was built in 1904. Sigge Cronstedt was the architect for this and other station buildings along Roslagsbanan.

Stocksund station used to be a junction, connecting the railway to a short standard gauge tram line through Stocksund, the so-called Långängsbanan terminating at Långängen, and there were also tracks to the Stocksund harbour, which was just nearby the railway station. The tram line was intended to be the beginning of a big tram rail network in Stocksund and Djursholm and also to be connected to the Stockholm city tram network, but of this came naught and in 1934 the tracks were converted to the narrow gauge of Roslagsbanan so the same waggons could be used. In 1966 the tram line was finally closed and the connection to the harbour was also closed, making Stocksund just a stop for passenger traffic on Roslagsbanan.

This old station was closed in 1996, replaced by a new station by the same name some hundred metres to the north west, set where a new bridge over Stocksundet and a new, straighter line of the railway allows higher speed for the trains.

Sources

Railway stations in Stockholm County

sv:Stocksunds station